Tillandsia moscosoi is an epiphyte in the genus Tillandsia.  It is endemic to the Dominican Republic. It has pale lavender flowers.

Cultivars
 Tillandsia 'Summer Dawn'

References

moscosoi
Flora of the Dominican Republic
Plants described in 1955
Flora without expected TNC conservation status